Heterometrus, whose members are also known by the collective vernacular name giant forest scorpions, is a genus of scorpions belonging to the family Scorpionidae. It is distributed widely across tropical and subtropical southeastern Asia, including Indonesia, Brunei, Malaysia, Myanmar, Philippines, Singapore, Cambodia, Laos, Thailand, Vietnam, India (Nicobar Islands, Andaman Islands), and China (Hainan). It is notable for containing some of the largest living species of scorpions.

Taxonomy
The genus was introduced by C.G. Ehrenberg (in Hemprich & Ehrenberg, 1828), originally as a subgenus of the genus Buthus. It was elevated to genus rank by F. Karsch in 1879. H.W.C. Couzijn (1978, 1981) subdivided the genus into several subgenera, but F. Kovařík (2004) synonymized these subgenera with the nominal genus. In 2020 the genus was reviewed by L. Prendini & S. F. Loria, three of the former subgenera were revalidated and elevated to genera and one valid subgenus was elevated to genus rank, species were transferred to appropriate genera, resulting in 28 new combinations.

Diversity
The content of this genus may vary, depending on the authority. Eight species are known, many of which are quite similar in appearance:

Heterometrus glaucus (Thorell, 1876)
Heterometrus laevigatus (Thorell, 1876)
Heterometrus laoticus Couzijn, 1981
Heterometrus longimanus (Herbst, 1800)
Heterometrus petersii (Thorell, 1876)
Heterometrus silenus (Simon, 1884)
Heterometrus spinifer (Ehrenberg, 1828)
Heterometrus thorellii (Pocock, 1897)

General characteristics
Members of Heterometrus are generally large-sized scorpions (100–200 mm or about 4-8 in total length). Coloration is dark in most species, often uniformly brown or black, sometimes with a greenish shine, with brighter-colored telson, walking legs, and/or pedipalp pincers in some species. The scorpions are heavily built with especially powerful and globose pedipalp pionkes, broad mesosomal tergites and a proportionally slender and thin metasoma. The telson is proportionally small and the stinger is often shorter than the vesicle. The cephalothorax and mesosoma are largely devoid of carinae and granulation and the median eyes are situated in a small, lenticular depression on the cephalothorax. Some species are parthenogenic.

Orthobothriotaxy type C. Pedipalp femur with three trichobothria and pedipalp patella consists with 19 trichobothria. Pedipalp chela with 26 trichobothria. Retrolateral pedal spurs are absent. Stridulatory organ is located on the opposing surfaces of pedipalp coxa and first leg.

Toxicity

As in other genera of the Scorpionidae, the symptoms from Heterometrus envenomations are rather mild and no human fatalities are known. The sting causes local pain, inflammation, oedema, swelling, and redness of the skin, lasting for hours to a few days. Plant extracts known in the traditional Thai medicine as natural scorpion venom antidotes are effective as symptomatic treatment of H. laoticus stings. The protein heteroscorpine-1 was found the major component of the venom in H. laoticus.

Habitat for the scorpion
Species of Heterometrus live in vegetated, often forested, humid regions with subtropical to tropical climates. As most scorpions, they are predominantly nocturnal and hide in burrows, below logs, and in leaf litter.

In captivity
Due to their impressive size, low toxicity, and docile behavior, species of Heterometrus are popular pet scorpions. Unlike many other scorpions, they can be kept in pairs or small groups.

References

External links
 Keeping instructions for H. spinifer and H. laoticus. Exotic Pets
 Images and descriptions of various species of Heterometrus. Mes Scorpions

Scorpionidae
Scorpion genera
Taxa named by Christian Gottfried Ehrenberg